Saint-Chaffrey is a commune in the Hautes-Alpes department in the Provence-Alpes-Côte d'Azur region in Southeastern France. In 2018, it had a population of 1,567. An alpine commune, Saint-Chaffrey is located in the Valley of the Guisane, on the road to Grenoble, between La Salle-les-Alpes to the northwest and Briançon to the southeast.

Geography
The commune of Saint-Chaffrey encompasses the villages of Saint-Chaffrey, Chantemerle, Villard-Laté and La Gérarde. It is situated at the heart of the Serre Chevalier ski resort, which has slopes that serve Chantemerle.

Demographics

Tour de France
Several stages of the Tour de France have started or finished in the commune of Saint-Chaffrey:

Finishes

Starts

Gallery

See also
Communes of the Hautes-Alpes department

References

Communes of Hautes-Alpes